IX.br is the Internet exchange point system of Brazil. It is operated by the Comitê Gestor da Internet no Brasil (Brazilian Internet Steering Committee, CGI.br). The performance of IX.br is focused on metropolitan areas. 

IX.br is an interconnection of metropolitan area network interconnection points (pixes), commercial and academic under centralized management. IX.br has 31 Internet exchange points in Brazil. The most important are located in São Paulo with a traffic peak over 13 Tbit/s, and Rio de Janeiro 2 Tbit/s.

Locations
 
Aracaju
Belém
Belo Horizonte
Brasília
Campina Grande
Campinas
Caxias do Sul
Cuiabá
Curitiba
Florianópolis
Fortaleza
Foz do Iguaçu
Goiânia
João Pessoa
Lajeado
Londrina
Maceió
Manaus
Maringá
Natal
Porto Alegre
Recife
Rio de Janeiro
Salvador
Santa Maria
São José dos Campos
São José do Rio Preto
São Luis
São Paulo
Teresina
Vitória

See also 
 List of Internet exchange points

References

External links
Official site
Traffic Statistics - Sum of traffic of all 31 locations

Internet exchange points in Latin America